São Manuel is a municipality in the state of São Paulo in Brazil. The population is 41,123 (2020 est.) in an area of 651 km². The elevation is 709 m.

History
On April 19, 1850, lieutenant Manoel Gomes de Faria, Dona Delfina Carolina Gomes, Antonio Joaquim Mendes, and Sinhorinha Rosa da Conceição, sponsored the foundation of Sao Manuel at Água Clara. On February 2, 1871, the location of the city was changed to Bairro do Paraízo, or the Tavares. The Chapel of St. Benedict was built and blessed in 1874. The date of foundation for the city is recorded as June 17, 1870.

Transportation
The city is served by Nelson Garófalo Airport.

People from São Manuel
 Alice Sommerlath (1906-1997), mother of Queen Silvia of Sweden.
 Karina Bacchi (born in 1976), actress.
 Emilio Surita (born in 1961), humorist.
 Teresa Surita (born in 1956), politician.

References

Municipalities in São Paulo (state)